Hemonia murina is a moth of the family Erebidae. It was described by Walter Rothschild in 1913. It is found on New Guinea.

References

Nudariina
Moths described in 1913